The Encyclopedia of Slovenia is a Slovene-language encyclopedia that contains topics related to Slovenia. It was published from 1987 to 2002 in 16 volumes by Mladinska knjiga in cooperation with the Slovenian Academy of Sciences and Arts.

The editors of the encyclopedia were Marjan Javornik, Dušan Voglar, and Alenka Dermastia, and the editors of special topics were Rajko Pavlovec, Blaž Resman, Janez Stergar, Zdravko Mlinar, Peter Weiss, Tone Wraber, Aleš Krbavčič, and Tone Ferenc.

The first volumes were published in a print run of 30,000, but the print run was reduced to 15,000 for later volumes.

For its overall work on the Encyclopedia of Slovenia, the publisher Mladinska knjiga received the Golden Order of Freedom of the Republic of Slovenia, the highest-ranking order awarded in Slovenia.

Volumes 
 A–Ca, 1987, xvii + 421 pages, 30,000 copies 
 Ce–Ed, 1988, xv + 416 pages, 31,000 copies 
 Eg–Hab, 1989, xv + 416 pages, 30,000 copies 
 Hac–Kare, 1990, xvii + 416 pages, 30,000 copies  
 Kari–Krei, 1991, xv + 416 pages, 22,000 copies 
 Krek–Marij, 1992, xv + 416 pages, 20,000 copies 
 Marin–Nor, 1993, xv + 416 pages, 20,000 copies 
 Nos–Pli, 1994, xvi + 416 pages, 20,000 copies  
 Plo–Ps, 1995, xv + 416 pages, 20,000 copies  
 Pt–Savn, 1996, xv + 416 pages, 20,000 copies   
 Savs–Slovenska m, 1997, xv + 416 pages, 18,000 copies  
 Slovenska n–Sz, 1998, xv + 416 pages, 18,000 copies   
 Š–T, 1999, xv + 416 pages, 18,000 copies  
 U–We, 2000, xv + 416 pages, 15,000 copies   
 Wi–Ž and Chronological Overview, 2001, xv + 416 pages, 15,000 copies   
 Additions A–Ž and Index, 2002, xv + 416 pages, 15,000 copies

References 

 

1987 non-fiction books
Slovenian encyclopedias
20th-century encyclopedias
Slovenian culture
Slovenia
Slovene-language books